Fairwater is the name of an electoral ward in the west of Cardiff, capital city of Wales. It covers Fairwater and Pentrebane on the outskirts of the urban area.

The Fairwater ward is bordered to the west by Pentyrch and St Fagans, to the east by Llandaff and to the south by the Ely ward.

Background
Fairwater has elected three councillors to Cardiff Council since 1995, being represented by the Labour Party until May 2008 when all three seats were taken by Plaid Cymru.

Plaid Cymru (Fairwater and Pentrebane Voice) and Labour (Fairwater and Pentrebane Fightback) have both issued local campaigning newsletters containing allegations and counter-allegations against one another. These have included accusations that Cllr Michael Michael, a hairdresser, was profiting from a council leased building and allegations about Cllr McEvoy's expenses.

During the 2008 election campaign former MP Rod Richards, who lived in Fairwater, was arrested after assaulting a fellow Conservative Party campaigner.

Plaid lost a seat in May 2012 but regained it in 2017. Ward representatives have included Labour councillor Michael Michael, who was deputy leader of the Cardiff Council until 2008 and Plaid Cymru's Neil McEvoy, who was deputy leader of the council from 2008 to 2012. McEvoy had previously been a Labour Party councillor for the Riverside ward in the city and was also elected as a Plaid Cymru Assembly Member in the Wales Government in 2016. McEvoy was expelled from Plaid Cymru in 2018 and the remaining two councillors resigned the Plaid Cymru party whip in October 2019 in protest at the treatment of McEvoy. They remained as independent councillors.

McEoy retained his seat in 2022, this time standing for the Propel party.

County councillors

Elections

May 2022
Attention was on the Fairwater ward in May 2022, with Neil McEvoy's new political party, Propel, hoping to win the seats previously won by his former party, Plaid Cymru. Plaid stood under the new coalition name of Common Ground. Whist McEvoy retained his seat, the other two seats were won by Labour.

May 2017

* = sitting councillor prior to the election

References

Cardiff electoral wards